Rocky Hill Ridge, also known as the Mount Lucas-Rocky Hill Ridge, named after Lucas Voorhees, an 18th-century landowner, is a diabase trap rock ridge running west to east in the US State of New Jersey. Diabase intrusions form Baldpate Mountain and Pennington Mountain, the Mount Rose extension of the Mount Lucas-Rocky Hill ridge, and part of the Sourland Mountains. The western section of the ridge, which runs to the northwest to The Sourlands (although not connecting with it because of the Hopewell Fault), is the Mount Rose section of the ridge.

References 

Ridges of New Jersey
Igneous petrology of New Jersey
Landforms of Mercer County, New Jersey